American Islamic Forum for Democracy (AIFD) is an American Muslim think tank formed in 2003 by Zuhdi Jasser in Phoenix, Arizona. 

AIFD advocates for the separation of religion and state and confronts the ideologies of political Islam and openly counters the belief that the Muslim faith is inextricably rooted to the concept of the Islamic state.

Mission
AIFD's mission statement as found on their website states, "is to advocate for the preservation of the founding principles of the United States Constitution, liberty and freedom, through the separation of mosque and state."

Founder
AIFD was founded by Zuhdi Jasser in March 2003. A former Lieutenant Commander in the United States Navy, Jasser served 11 years as a medical officer. He is a recipient of the Meritorious Service Medal.

Timothy R. Furnish said that Jasser's quest is to resurrect the doctrine of the Mu'tazilah, a group in early Islamic history which stated that reason was as important as revelation, and that the Qur'an was created rather than eternally existent and that humans had free will.

References

External links
 

Islamic organizations based in the United States
Muslim reformers
Liberal and progressive movements within Islam
Think tanks based in the United States
Think tanks established in 2003